OCC-1 (overexpressed in colon carcinoma-1) is a protein, which in humans is encoded by the gene C12orf75. The gene is approximately 40,882 bp long and encodes 63 amino acids. OCC-1 is ubiquitously expressed throughout the human body. OCC-1 has shown to be overexpressed in various colon carcinomas.
Novel splice variant of this gene was also detected in various human cancer types; in addition to encoding a novel smaller protein (51 amino acids), OCC-1 gene produces a non-protein coding RNA splice variant lncRNA (called OCC-D variant).

Gene
Location and size:
C12orf75 is found along the plus strand of chromosome 12 (12q23.3). The gene is 40,882 bp long with the genomic sequence beginning at 105,330,636 bp and ends at 105,371,518 bp. C12orf75 contains 6 exons and is flanked by KCCAT198 (renal clear cell carcinoma-associated transcript 198).

mRNA
C12orf75 encodes several transcripts of mRNA that the longest one is 1386 bp. The mature mRNA of this splice variant contains six exons.

Protein
Structure
Primary structure:
OCC-1 protein is 63 amino acids long  and has a molecular weight of 6.4 kdal. OCC-1 contains an “opioid growth factor receptor repeat” (OGFr)  motif from residue 8 to 27. OCC-1 is an acidic protein with an isoelectric point of OCC-1 is 6.6.

Secondary structure:
The secondary structure of OCC-1 is a combination of multiple coils, a few α-helices, and few β-sheets. The Phyre 2 program 52% α-helices, 6% β-sheets, and 70% disordered. The predicted region β-sheet from residues 31 to 38 coincide with the α-helices and β-sheets regions predicted by other programs. OCC-1 is a soluble protein; according to the SOUSI program therefore there are no transmembrane domains.

Tertiary structure:
Predicted folding by iTASSER is shown. 

Post translational modifications:
OCC-1 is predicted to undergo the post-translational modifications of O-glycosylation, phosphorylation, and myristoylation.

Subcellular location:
The k-NN tool places OCC-1 in the nucleus of the cell with 65.2% certainty, 13% in the mitochondria, 8.7% in the vesicles of the secretory system, 4.3% cytoplasm, and 4.3% vacuole.

Homology
Paralogs:
OCC-1 has no known paralogs.

Orthologs:
OCC-1 has been found in mammalia, reptilia, amphibian, aves, and actinopterygii. The gene is not found in plants, protists, fungi, archaea, or bacteria. The most distant ortholog is the Oryzias latipers or the Japanese rice fish, which diverged from the human gene approximately 436.5 million years ago.

Phylogeny: 
The phylogenetic tree to the right shows the evolution of OCC-1 among humans and the orthologs from the various taxa that contain OCC-1. The results of this phylogenetic tree follow in accordance with the predicted evolutionary history of animals on Earth.

Expression
Expression level:
OCC-1 has moderate to high expression throughout the body, therefore OCC-1 is ubiquitously expressed in humans; notably high expression in the kidney, skeletal muscle and pancreas and low expression in the heart. OCC-1 has shown to be overexpressed in various colon carcinomas.
In regards to homologous expression, in situ hybridization data revealed that OCC-1 is expressed in the primary visual cortex of the macque, in an activity dependent manner.

Disease state expression:
Profiles from NCBI UniGene show the expression of OCC-1 in adrenal tumors, chondrosarcoma, gastrointestinal tumors, kidney tumors, leukemia, liver tumors, prostate cancer, soft tissue/muscle tissue tumors, and uterine tumors.

Regulation of expression
Promoter:
The promoter of OCC-1 is GXP_4407929 and 601 bp in length. The promoter can be found on the plus strand and begins at 105234790 bp and ends at 105235390 bp.

Interacting proteins
OCC-1 is shown to interact with HRG4, ELAVL1, c-REL, and IRS4. ELAVL1 functions to stabilized mRNA for gene expression. C-REL is involved in lymphoid and cell growth/survival, with a specific presence in T cell malignancies and cancer. HRG4 plays a role in signal transduction and trafficking sensory neurons and is located primarily in the retina, which relates to the discovery of expression in the brain of the macque through in situ hybridization data. IRS4 functions as interface between growth factor receptors consisting of tyrosine kinase activity, such as insulin receptors. IRS4 also is involved with the IGF1R mitogenic signaling pathway.

Clinical significance
OCC-1 has shown to be overexpressed in multiple colon carcinomas.

References

Genes
Proteins